Phyllostachys platyglossa  is a species of bamboo found in Jiangsu, Zhejiang provinces of China

References

External links
 
 

platyglossa
Flora of China